Qareh Khan-e Sofla (also Romanized as Qareh Khān-e Soflá; also known as Qareh Khān-e Pā’īn) is a village in Buzi Rural District, in the Central District of Shadegan County, Khuzestan Province, Iran. At the 2006 census, its population was 24, in 5 families.

References 

Populated places in Shadegan County